The 1925–26 Michigan Wolverines men's basketball team represented the University of Michigan in intercollegiate college basketball during the 1925–26 season. E. J. Mather was in his seventh season as the coach. Team captain Richard Doyle became the school's first basketball All-American.

Season record
Source:

December 12: Michigan 32, Ohio Wesleyan 27
December 17: Michigan 34, Univ. of Pittsburgh 25 
January 2: Michigan 27, Missouri 19 
January 9: Michigan 32, Northwestern 30 
January 11: Michigan 22, Iowa 16 
January 16: Michigan 38, Michigan State 15 
January 18: Illinois 31, Michigan 29 
February 6: Michigan 33, Minnesota 22 
February 8: Syracuse 36, Michigan 326
February 13: Iowa 24, Michigan 21 
February 15: Minnesota 28, Michigan 17 
February 20: Ohio State 32, Michigan 31 
February 22: Michigan 22, Wisconsin 13 
February 26: Michigan 33, Illinois 24 
March 1: Michigan 24, Wisconsin 23 
March 6: Michigan 44, Ohio State 28 
March 8: Michigan 46, Northwestern 14

References

Michigan
Michigan Wolverines men's basketball seasons
Michigan Wolverines basketball
Michigan Wolverines basketball